Kolia Bhomora Setu, an existing bridge completed in 1987, is a 3.015 km long pre-stressed concrete road bridge on NH-715 over the Brahmaputra River in Tezpur Assam state of India, which connects Tezpur in Sonitpur district on northern bank with Kaliabor in Nagaon District on the south bank. It is named after the Ahom General Kolia Bhomora Phukan. A new Bhomoraguri-Tezpur Bridge 3.249 km long, few meters parallel to the existing Kolia Bhomora Setu, is under-construction in 2021.

History

In 1987, it was inaugurated by the then PM of India, Rajiv Gandhi, after completing its construction from 1981 to 1987. On 14 April 1987, India Post issued an INR2 commemorative stamp of this. In 1988, American Concrete Institute awarded Hindustan Construction Company the Certificate of Merit for the Most Outstanding Concrete Structure. In 2016, the collection of toll was stopped due to complaints that the bridge construction cost was Rs. 80 crore which was below tollable ceiling of Rs. 100 crores.

Accidents & Incidents

 On 23 January 2021, an 18-wheeler truck lost its controlled and crashed into the bridge's railing leaving the front of the truck hanging out of the bridge. However, no fatalities or injuries have been reported.
 In 2020, an oil tanker reportedly fell of the bridge. There were 3 people on board when the incident took place, but only one survived the crash. The tanker was empty preventing the risk of fire. It was headed to Lumding.
 On 7 March 2020, a fully loaded truck lost its control and fell off the brigge. The truck landed on the bank of the Brahmaputra River. The driver was seriously injured and was rushed to a nearby hospital.
 On 21 June 2019, a truck with a trailer loaded with cars fell off the bridge. The truck was arriving from Punjab. The truck driver succumbed to his injuries.
 On 8 November 2018, a passenger vehicle carrying 16 people crashed into a truck. Three people died on the spot while thirteen were injured.

See also
 List of bridges on Brahmaputra River
 List of longest bridges in the world
 List of longest bridges above water in India

Gallery

References

External links
Kalia bhomora Bridge view in the early morning
Wikimapia entry with aerial view
News item in Projects Monitor website

Bridges in Assam
Transport in Tezpur
Bridges completed in 1987
Bridges over the Brahmaputra River
1987 establishments in Assam
20th-century architecture in India